Big Brother 3 is the third season of various versions of Big Brother and may refer to:

Big Brother 2001 (Netherlands), the 2001 Dutch edition of Big Brother
Big Brother Germany (Season 3), the 2001 German edition of Big Brother
Gran Hermano Spain (Season 3), the 2002 edition of Big Brother in Spain
Big Brother 3 (UK), the 2002 UK edition of Big Brother
Big Brother 3 (U.S.), the 2002 US edition of Big Brother
Gran Hermano Argentina (Season 3), the 2002-2003 Argentinian edition of Big Brother
Big Brother Australia 2003, the 2003 Australian edition of Big Brother
Big Brother Brasil 3, the 2003 Brazilian edition of Big Brother
Big Brother 3 (The Wall), the 2003 Greek edition of Big Brother
Grande Fratello Season 3, the 2003 edition of Big Brother in Italy
Big Brother 3 (Bulgaria), the 2006 Bulgarian edition of Big Brother
Big Brother 3 (Croatia), the 2006 Croatian edition of Big Brother
Big Brother 2007 (Finland), the 2007 edition of Big Brother in Finland
Big Brother Africa (season 3), the 2008 African edition of Big Brother
Veliki brat 2009, the 2009 edition of Big Brother in Serbia, Bosnia and Herzegovina, Macedonia, and Montenegro
Secret Story 2009 (France), the 2009 edition of Big Brother in France
Bigg Boss (Hindi Season 3), the 2009 Hindi-language editionof Big Brother in India
Bigg Boss (Telugu season 3), the 2019 Telugu-language edition of Big Brother in India
Pinoy Big Brother: Double Up, the 2009-2010 edition of Big Brother in the Philippines
Big Brother 3 (Albania), the 2010 Albanian edition of Big Brother
HaAh HaGadol 3, the 2010–2011 edition of Big Brother in Israel
Secret Story 3 (Portugal), the 2012 edition of Big Brother in Portugal
Big Brother Canada (season 3), the 2015 edition of Big Brother Canada

See also
 Big Brother (franchise)
 Big Brother (disambiguation)